Ivan Ivanovich Tvorozhnikov (October 10, 1848 – 1919) was a Russian painter and a member of the Imperial Academy of Arts.

Biography
Tvorozhnikov graduated from the Saint Petersburg Drawing School attached to the Society of Imperial Incentive. Finishing his studies there in 1868, he entered the Academy of Arts, where he continued his education up to 1875. Tvorozhnikov's major works are considered to be The salvation books vendor (1888), Grandmother and granddaughter, Mirovich by the corpse of Ioann Antonovich on July 5, 1764, By the church (1889) and God sent the mercy.

A son of peasants from Moscow Guberniya, Tvorozhnikov was born in Zhukovo village of the Tver uyezd. Being 12 years old, he was sent to Saint Petersburg for wages. Later, Tvorozhnikov repeatedly visited the Tver Guberniya.

Works

Further reading
 Михайлов, А. Иван Творожников. Художник, 1987, N 12.

19th-century painters from the Russian Empire
Russian male painters
20th-century Russian painters
1848 births
1919 deaths
19th-century male artists from the Russian Empire
20th-century Russian male artists